Ann-Sofie Sandberg (born in 1951) is a Swedish professor in Food and Nutritional Science at Chalmers University of Technology.

Biography 

Sandberg got her PhD in 1982. Her dissertation was on the 'Effects of Dietary Fibers on Ileostomy Patients'.

In 2010 she was elected into the Royal Swedish Academy of Engineering Sciences. She was awarded an honorary doctorate degree in 2013 at the Sahlgrenska Academy for strengthening the connections between medical and technological research in Gothenburg.

Work 

Her research is on improving nutrient properties and physical functions of food by utilizing different biological techniques.

Sandberg has co-authored more than 300 publications within her research area.

Awards 

 2014 : Chalmers Gustaf Dalén Memorial Medal for "prominent academic contributions in food science".

References 

1951 births
Academic staff of the Chalmers University of Technology
Food scientists
People from Gothenburg
Living people
Women food scientists